Petr Ardeleánu (Romanian: Petre Ardeleanu; born 14 December 1980) is a Czech football referee who officiates in the Czech First League. He has been a FIFA referee since 2013, and is ranked as a UEFA first category referee. He has Romanian and Czech ancestry.

Refereeing career
In 2005, Ardeleánu began officiating in the Czech First League. In 2013, he was put on the FIFA referees list. He officiated his first senior international match on 16 October 2018 between Latvia and Georgia. In 2019, he was selected as the referee for the final of the 2018–19 Czech Cup on 22 May 2019 between Baník Ostrava and Slavia Prague. He also officiated matches in the Chinese Super League in 2019.

References

External links
 Profile at WorldFootball.net
 Profile at EU-Football.info

1980 births
Living people
Czech football referees
Czech people of Romanian descent